Malena Pichot (born 6 July 1982) is an Argentine feminist stand-up comedian, actress and screenwriter.

Biography
Pichot rose to fame in 2008, when she uploaded a video to YouTube after breaking up with her boyfriend, titled "La loca de mierda" (roughly translated "The Fucking Crazy Woman"). After a series of humorous La Loca de Mierda YouTube videos were viewed by millions of people, MTV Latin America hired Pichot to broadcast her videos on its website.

After having become an Internet celebrity, Pichot presented her stand-up show Concheta pero con gracia (roughly translated "posh but funny",) and has been performing with Ezequiel Campa in the stand-up comedy show Campa-Pichot since 2010.

In 2011 Pichot joined the cast of El hombre de tu vida, an Argentine comedy series created by Juan José Campanella that aired in Telefe.

In 2012 Pichot had her own sketch comedy segment in Canal 9's show Duro de domar, called Cualca!, available in YouTube.

In 2013, she created and acted in two other series: Jorge, an 8-episode series on TV Publica, and Por ahora, a 13-episode series on Cosmopolitan TV.

In 2018, Pichot had a stand up special, Estupidez compleja (Complex Stupidity), air on Netflix. The show is about feminism and Argentine culture.

Family
She is the cousin of Argentine rugby player Agustín Pichot.

References

1982 births
21st-century Argentine actresses
21st-century comedians
21st-century screenwriters
Actresses from Buenos Aires
Argentine columnists
Argentine women columnists
Argentine feminists
Argentine people of French descent
Argentine screenwriters
Argentine stand-up comedians
Argentine television actresses
Argentine women comedians
Argentine YouTubers
Comedy-related YouTube channels
Comedy YouTubers
Feminist comedians
Living people
Peronists
Political comedy
Spanish-language YouTubers
Women screenwriters
YouTube channels launched in 2007